Allahabad-e Olya (also Romanized as Allāhābād-e ‘Olyā; also known as Allāhābād-e Bālā) is a village in Howmeh Rural District, in the Central District of Shirvan County, North Khorasan Province, Iran. At the 2006 census, its population was 673, in 188 families.

References 

Populated places in Shirvan County